Rush Hour 3 is a 2007 American buddy action comedy film directed by Brett Ratner, written by Jeff Nathanson, and starring Jackie Chan, Chris Tucker, Max von Sydow, Hiroyuki Sanada, Noémie Lenoir, Yvan Attal and Youki Kudoh. It is the third installment in the Rush Hour franchise and centers on Inspector Lee (Chan) and Officer Carter (Tucker) tracking an assassin to Paris to unravel a mystery about the Chinese triads. Announced on May 7, 2006, filming began on July 4 on location in Paris and Los Angeles. Released on August 10, 2007, the film received mixed-to-negative reviews from film critics. Despite this, it was a box office success, grossing $258 million worldwide against a $140 million budget.

Plot
Three years after the events of Rush Hour 2, in 2001, Chinese Ambassador Solon Han, with Hong Kong Police Force Chief Inspector Lee as his bodyguard, addresses the importance of fighting the Triads at the World Criminal Court in Los Angeles. 

When Han starts to announce the whereabouts of Shy Shen, a semi-mythical individual of great importance to the Chinese mob, an assassin in the building across from them suddenly snipes him, causing an outrageous panic of many in the nearby streets. Lee corners the shooter, but when he learns that this is his childhood foster brother, Kenji, who shot the ambassador, he hesitates, allowing Kenji to escape just as LAPD Detective James Carter arrives after hearing what happened over the police radio.

Han is later hospitalized at UCLA Medical Center, surviving the assassination attempt, and Lee and Carter promise his daughter Soo Yung to find the person responsible. She insists they head to the local Kung Fu studio to retrieve an envelope Han left her, but learn from the studio master the Triads took Soo Yung's belongings.

Lee and Carter return to the hospital and intercept a few French-speaking Chinese hitmen before they can further injure Han. After defeating them, Lee and Carter interrogate one of them with the help of Sister Agnes, a French-speaking nun. For her protection, they take Soo Yung to the French Embassy, leaving her with French ambassador and chairman of the World Criminal Court, Varden Reynard. When Reynard and Soo Yung are nearly killed by a car bomb, Lee and Carter go to Paris to investigate this case further.

After a painful inspection from Parisian Commissaire Revi, Lee and Carter meet anti-American taxicab driver, George, and force him to drive them to a Triad hideout. While there, Carter meets stage performer Geneviève while Lee is tricked by mob assassin Jasmine, who claims to have information about Shy Shen, and Carter saves Lee from being killed.

The pair tries to escape, but is ultimately captured by Kenji's men. Kenji says he'll let them live if they leave Paris, but Lee refuses. Following a short struggle, he and Carter successfully escape. They recover and rest at a hotel where they both book themselves a room, and Lee soon reveals his relationship with Kenji and decides to continue alone. 

A disillusioned Carter leaves, but recomposes himself when he spots and follows Geneviève. Meanwhile, Reynard meets Lee and explains Shy Shen is not a person, but a list of Triad leaders and that Geneviève is Han's informant with access to the list.

After locating Geneviève and saving her from being killed, the two flee with her to their hotel. They are attacked by Jasmine, but George rescues them out of a newfound admiration for Americans. Geneviève reveals to Lee and Carter that the Triad leaders' names were tattooed on the back of her head and that she will be beheaded when the Triads capture her. Lee and Carter bring her to Reynard and discover he was working with the Triads the entire time. Kenji calls to inform Lee that he has captured Soo Yung and demands he turn over Geneviève.

Lee arrives at the Eiffel Tower to make the exchange, with Carter disguised as Geneviève with a wig. Kenji challenges Lee to a sword fight, during which the two fall into a safety net. After Kenji's sword cuts the net, Lee tries to save him, but Kenji is touched by Lee's kindness and lets go, falling to his death and devastating Lee. 

Meanwhile, Carter saves Soo Yung and defeats Jasmine by kicking her into an elevator wheel that seemingly bisects her. After escaping the remaining Triad members, Carter and Lee are confronted by Reynard, who threatens to kill Geneviève and frame them. However, George shoots Reynard from behind, killing him. As the police arrive, Revi tries to take credit for Lee and Carter's work, but they knock him out and leave with a victory dance to Edwin Starr's "War".

Cast 

 Jackie Chan as Chief Inspector Lee of the HKPF, the head of Ambassador Han's security detail.
 Chris Tucker as Detective James Carter of the LAPD.  Carter is assigned to traffic duty at the beginning of the film as punishment for an unspecified offense when he gets drawn into the investigation of Ambassador Han's shooting.
 Hiroyuki Sanada as Kenji Brother, Lee's "brother" who grew up together with Lee in an orphanage but later turned to a life of crime.
 Max Von Sydow as Varden Reynard, the head of the World Criminal Court who is secretly in league with the Triads.
 Yvan Attal as George Cabbie, a French taxi driver.
 Youki Kudoh as Dragon Lady Jasmine
 Noémie Lenoir as Geneviève / Shy Shen, a French burlesque performer who gets involved with the Triads after dating Kenji.
 Zhang Jingchu as Soo-Yung Han, Ambassador Han's daughter.
 Tzi Ma as Ambassador Solon Han, the Chinese Ambassador to the U.S. whom Kenji attempts to assassinate.
 Roman Polanski  as Commissaire Revi (uncredited), a French policeman who assaults Lee and Carter at the airport and later attempts to take credit for their work.
 Philip Baker Hall as Captain Bill Diel (uncredited), Carter's supervisor in the LAPD.
 Dana Ivey as Sister Agnes, a nun who translates for Carter and Lee.
 Henry O as Master Yu
 Mia Tyler as Marsha
 Sarah Shahi as Zoe (uncredited)
 David Niven Jr. as British Foreign Minister
 Sun Mingming as Kung-Fu Giant
 Julie Depardieu as Paulette

Production
After the commercial success of the first and second films in the franchise, Tucker received a salary of $25 million, Chan received $15 million, and Ratner $7.5 million. In addition, Chan received 15% of the box office revenue as well as distribution rights in China and Hong Kong, bringing his total earnings to at least .

The scene where Chan and Tucker fight the Kung-Fu Giant, played by Chinese basketball player Sun Mingming, is a parody of Bruce Lee's Game of Death, where Lee fights a taller black man played by NBA basketball player Kareem Abdul-Jabbar. The film subverts it by having a shorter African-American man, Tucker, fight a taller Chinese man played by a basketball player, Sun.

Release
The film was not screened in Chinese theaters in 2007, to make way for a larger variety of foreign films for that year, according to a business representative. (The quota for imported films was 20 per year at the time.)

Soundtrack

Lalo Schifrin composed the soundtrack, interspersed with hip hop and R&B music. Two soundtrack albums were released. An album of the hip hop and R&B music used was released on August 8, 2007, on CD and audio cassette from New Line Records and Columbia Records. Another, containing Schifrin's original compositions for the film was released on the Varèse Sarabande label.

Reception

Box office
Rush Hour 3 opened on August 10, 2007, and grossed $49.1 million in its opening weekend.

Brandon Gray of Box Office Mojo noted:

The film grossed $258 million worldwide.

Critical response
On Rotten Tomatoes, the film has an approval rating of 17% based on 157 reviews, with an average rating of 4.2/10. The site's critical consensus reads, "Rush Hour 3 is a tired rehash of the earlier films, and a change of scenery can't hide a lack of new ideas." Todd Gilchrist of IGN movies said, "A movie that not only depends on but demands you don't think in order to enjoy it." On Metacritic, the film has a score of 44 out of 100, based on 32 critics, indicating "mixed or average reviews". Audiences surveyed by CinemaScore gave the film an average grade of "A−" on an A+ to F scale.

Desson Thomson of The Washington Post, giving it three and a half stars out of five, said "at the risk of eternal damnation on the Internet, I admit to laughing at — even feeling momentarily touched by — Rush Hour 3." Christian Toto of The Washington Times said, "The Rush job should put the franchise down for good." Roger Ebert of the Chicago Sun-Times was slightly more positive giving the film two stars and saying, "...once you realize it's only going to be so good, you settle back and enjoy that modest degree of goodness, which is at least not badness, and besides, if you're watching Rush Hour 3, you obviously didn't have anything better to do, anyway." James Berardinelli of ReelViews gave the film one-and-a-half stars out of four, and said the movie was dull, uninspired and redundant.

Home media
The film was released on December 26, 2007, on DVD and Blu-ray. As of March 30, 2008, it made $80.75 million in Home Video rentals, making it the top rental of 2007. As of 2018, the film has grossed  in American DVD sales.

Sequel

Tucker said in 2019 that he, Chan, and the studio were all interested in a sequel.  In December 2022, Chan said that he was in talks to star.

See also
 Jackie Chan filmography

Notes

References
  Text was copied from Rush Hour (franchise)#Future at Wikipedia, which is released under a Creative Commons Attribution-Share Alike 3.0 (Unported) (CC-BY-SA 3.0) license.

External links

 
 
 
 
 

2007 films
Films shot in Paris
Films set in Paris
Paris in fiction
Films shot in Los Angeles
Films shot in New York City
Films shot in California
Films set in Los Angeles
2007 action comedy films
2007 martial arts films
American action comedy films
American buddy cop films
American martial arts films
American sequel films
American police detective films
Films directed by Brett Ratner
French comedy films
2000s martial arts comedy films
New Line Cinema films
Films set in 2000
Triad films
Films scored by Lalo Schifrin
Films produced by Roger Birnbaum
2000s police comedy films
2000s buddy cop films
Films with screenplays by Jeff Nathanson
Rush Hour (franchise)
2007 comedy films
2000s American films
American buddy comedy films
2000s French films
2000s Hong Kong films